Rope-dancing is the general art and act of performing on or with a rope.

There are a variety of forms and techniques which have been used throughout history.  These include:

 Chinese jump rope – in which a circular rope is used to make patterns in a technique which resembles hopscotch and the cat's cradle
 Rope-sliding – in which the performer slides down a tight rope or cable somewhat like a modern zip line
 Skipping – in which the performer repeatedly jumps over a swinging rope 
 Slackwire – in which the rope or wire is slack and so a swinging technique is needed
 Tightrope walking – in which the rope or wire is tight and a balancing technique is used

History
In 165 BC, the first production of Terence's play Hecyra failed due to the rival attraction of rope-dancing, as recounted by the prologue.

See also
 Abseiling
 Indian rope trick

References

Circus skills
Performing arts
Ropes